Air de Paris is a contemporary art gallery owned and directed by Florence Bonnefous and Edouard Merino, now located in Romainville, France.

History
Air de Paris was established 1990 in Nice by Bonnefous and Merino, who attended the École du Magasin in Grenoble together. In 1994, the gallery relocated to Paris, first at a location on rue des Haudriettes. Alongside other galleries including Almine Rech and Galerie Perrotin, Air de Paris moved to spaces on Rue Louise Weiss in the 13th arrondissement in 1997, as part a city-sponsored initiative. In 2019, Air de Paris joined forces with three other galleries (Jocelyn Wolff, In Situ Fabienne Leclerc and Sator), a public institution Le Plateau frac île de france and Fiminco Foundation to open spaces in Komunuma, an  four-building arts complex in Romainville. Together with In Situ Fabienne Leclerc, the gallery occupies four-storey spaces and a shared roof terrace.

The name "Air de Paris" was a tribute to Marcel Duchamp and his "ready-made" 50cc of Paris Air. At the beginning, there was Les Ateliers du Paradise with Philippe Perrin, Pierre Joseph and Philippe Parreno. The exhibition was conceived like a movie in real time, that would last for a summer, transforming the gallery into a photogenic space. Paul McCarthy, Lily van der Stokker and Jean-Luc Verna, among others, participated to the reputation of the Nicean formula.

Air de Paris represents established practicing artists such as Parreno, Liam Gillick, Claire Fontaine, Rob Pruitt, Trisha Donnelly and Bruno Serralongue, historically important artists such as Guy de Cointet, Dorothy Iannone and Allen Ruppersberg, and emerging artists such as Eliza Douglas and Aaron Flint Jamison. Air de Paris also represents the photographic work of Michel Houellebecq since his large survey exhibition at Palais de Tokyo in 2016.

Artists
Air de Paris represents numerous living artists, including:

 Leonor Antunes
 Sadie Benning
 François Curlet
 Stéphane Dafflon
 Brice Dellsperger
 Eliza Douglas
 Trisha Donnelly
 Claire Fontaine
 Guyton\Walker
 Liam Gillick
 Joseph Grigely
 Carsten Höller
 Michel Houellebecq
 Aaron Flint Jamison
 Pierre Joseph
 Ingrid Luche
 M/M (Paris)
 Monica Majoli
 Mrzyk & Moriceau
 Sarah Morris
 Philippe Parreno
 Rob Pruitt
 Torbjørn Rødland
 Allen Ruppersberg
 Bruno Serralongue
 Shimabuku
 Lily van der Stokker
 Jean-Luc Verna

In the past, the gallery has worked with the following artists and estates: 

 Guy de Cointet
 Dorothy Iannone

Art fairs
Air de Paris is present at major contemporary art fairs including Art Basel, Independent in New York, FIAC in Paris and Artissima in Turin. Since 2022, Bonnefous has been serving on the selection committee of Art Basel's Paris edition.

References

External links
Air de Paris official website

1990 establishments in France
Art galleries established in 1990
Contemporary art galleries in France
Art museums and galleries in Paris
French art dealers